The 2018–19 NC State Wolfpack men's basketball team represented North Carolina State University during the 2018–19 NCAA Division I men's basketball season. The Wolfpack, led by second-year head coach Kevin Keatts, played its home games at PNC Arena in Raleigh, North Carolina and were members of the Atlantic Coast Conference (ACC). They finished the season 24–12, 9–9 in ACC play to finish in a tie for eighth place. They lost in the quarterfinals of the ACC tournament to Virginia. They received a bid to the NIT where they lost in the quarterfinals to Lipscomb.

Previous season
The Wolfpack finished the 2017–18 season 21–12, 11–7 in ACC play to finish in a tie for third place. They lost in the second round of the ACC tournament to Boston College. They received an at-large bid to the NCAA tournament where they lost in the first round to Seton Hall.

Offseason

Departures

Incoming transfers

Under NCAA transfer rules, Killeya-Jones will have to sit out for the 2018–19 season. Will have two years of remaining eligibility.
Under NCAA transfer rules, Harris has to sit out until January and will be eligible to start in January during the 2018–19 season. Harris has two and a half years of remaining eligibility.

Class of 2018 Recruiting Class

Roster

Schedule and results

|-
!colspan=12 style=|Exhibition

|-
!colspan=12 style=| Non-conference regular season

|-
!colspan=12 style=| ACC regular season

|-
!colspan=12 style=| ACC Tournament

|-
!colspan=12 style=| NIT

Rankings

*AP does not release post-NCAA Tournament rankings
^AP rankings not released for Week 1
'Coaches rankings not released for Week 1 or Week 2

References

NC State Wolfpack men's basketball seasons
Nc State
NC State Wolfpack men's basketball
NC State Wolfpack men's basketball
NC State